Evelyn Murray may refer to:
 Zainab Cobbold (1867–1963), born Lady Evelyn Murray, Scottish diarist, traveller and noblewoman
 Evelyn Murray (civil servant) (1880–1947), English civil servant
 Lady Evelyn Stewart Murray (1868–1940), Scottish folklorist